The 2011–12 Luge World Cup was a multi race series over a season for luge. The season started on 26 November 2011 in Igls, Austria and ended on 26 February 2012 in Paramonovo, Russia. The World Cup was organised by the FIL and sponsored by Viessmann.

Calendar 
Below is the schedule for the 2011/12 season.

Results

Men's singles

Doubles

Women's singles

Team relay

Standings

Men's singles

Doubles

Women's singles

Team relay

See also
FIL World Luge Championships 2012

References

Luge World Cup
2011 in luge
2012 in luge